Charles Desmarais (born April 21, 1949) is the Art Critic for the San Francisco Chronicle.

A native of the Bronx, Desmarais earned a bachelor's and master's degree from the State University of New York, Buffalo, and was a 1983 participant in the Museum Management Institute (later the Getty Leadership Institute program of the Getty Foundation).

In the 1980s, Desmarais directed the California Museum of Photography at the University of California, Riverside. He was director of the Laguna Art Museum, in Laguna Beach, California from 1988 to 1994. He then served as director of the Contemporary Arts Center in Cincinnati from 1995 until January 2004. From 2005 to 2011, he was deputy director for art at the Brooklyn Museum, where he oversaw ten curatorial departments, as well as the museum’s education, exhibitions, conservation and library activities. In 2011 he was appointed president of the San Francisco Art Institute, a position he left in October 2015.

Since 1985, he has been married to Kitty Morgan, former editor-in-chief of Sunset magazine and now Assistant Managing Editor - Lifestyle Content Director of the San Francisco Chronicle.

Exhibitions and books by Desmarais
Desmarais has curated exhibitions on various artists, photographers and architects. His books and exhibition catalogues include:

Roger Mertin: Records 1976-78 (1978)
Michael Bishop (1979)
The Portrait Extended (1980)
Why I Got into TV and Other Stories: The Art of Ilene Segalove (1990)
Proof: Los Angeles Art and the Photograph, 1960-1980 (1992)
Humongolous: Sculpture and Other Works by Tim Hawkinson (1996)
Jim Dine Photographs (1999)
Stephan Balkenhol (2000)
Nothing Compared to This: Ambient, Incidental and New Minimal Tendencies in Current Art (2004)
[with Markus Dochantschi] Zaha Hadid: Space for Art (2005)

Awards
1979: Art Critics Fellowship by the National Endowment for the Arts. 
2017: Rabkin Prize for Visual Arts Journalism.

References

American art curators
American art historians
Living people
Heads of universities and colleges in the United States
University at Buffalo alumni
1949 births
People from the Bronx
Historians from New York (state)